Maxime Hautbois (born 3 January 1991) is a French professional footballer who plays as a goalkeeper for  club Laval.

Career
Born in Laval, Hautbois played eight seasons with his home-town club Laval, and in the 2017–18 season was voted 2nd best goalkeeper in the Championnat National. He left the club at the end of the same season, having refused to take a salary cut, and signed for Lyon-Duchère.

On 9 July 2021, Hautbois returned to Laval.

Honours 
Laval

 Championnat National: 2021–22

Notes

References

1991 births
Living people
French footballers
Association football goalkeepers
Stade Lavallois players
Lyon La Duchère players
Championnat National 3 players
Ligue 2 players
Championnat National players